Tveteraas is a surname. Notable people with the surname include:

Rasmus Tveteraas (1862–1938), Norwegian schoolteacher, school inspector and politician
Signe Hofgaard Tveteraas (1901–1998), Norwegian dancer, choreographer and organizational leader
Vilhelm Tveteraas (1898–1972), Norwegian printmaker, painter and illustrator